The 2005 Armenian Cup was the 14th edition of the Armenian Cup, a football competition. In 2005, the tournament had 17 participants, out of which 5 were reserve teams.

Results

Preliminary round
The first leg was played on the 8 March 2005. The second leg was played on the 11 March 2005.

|}

First round
The first legs were played on 14 and 15 March 2005. The second legs were played on 19 and 20 March 2005.

|}

Quarter-finals
The first legs were played on 3 and 4 April 2005. The second legs were played on 7 and 8 April 2005.

|}

Semi-finals

The first legs were played on 22 April 2005. The second legs were played on 26 and 28 April 2005.

|}

Final

See also
 2005 Armenian Premier League
 2005 Armenian First League

External links
  at Soccerway.com
 2005 Armenian Cup at rsssf.com

Armenian Cup seasons
Armenia
Armenian Cup, 2005